The Branner-Hicks House is a historic house in Jefferson City, Tennessee, USA.

History
The house was completed in the mid-1850s. It was built on land acquired by George Branner in the 1830s for his son, Benjamin Manassah Branner (1805–1879), who went on to serve as Lieutenant-Colonel in the Confederate States Army during the American Civil War of 1861–1865.

Architectural significance
The house was designed as a combination of the Gothic Revival architectural style and the Romanesque Revival architectural style. It has been listed on the National Register of Historic Places since July 9, 1974.

References

Houses completed in the 19th century
Houses in Jefferson County, Tennessee
Gothic Revival architecture in Tennessee
Romanesque Revival architecture in Tennessee
Houses on the National Register of Historic Places in Tennessee
National Register of Historic Places in Jefferson County, Tennessee